Microbianor is a genus of African jumping spiders that was first described by D. V. Logunov in 2000. 
The name is derived from the Ancient Greek  (micro), meaning "small", and the genus Bianor.

Species
 it contains eight species, found only in Africa:
Microbianor deltshevi Logunov, 2009 – Madagascar
Microbianor furcatus Haddad & Wesolowska, 2013 – South Africa
Microbianor globosus Haddad & Wesolowska, 2011 – South Africa
Microbianor golovatchi Logunov, 2000 – Seychelles
Microbianor madagascarensis Logunov, 2009 – Madagascar
Microbianor nigritarsus Logunov, 2000 (type) – Seychelles
Microbianor saaristoi Logunov, 2000 – Seychelles, Réunion
Microbianor simplex Wesołowska & Haddad, 2018 – South Africa

References

Further reading
 

Salticidae genera
Salticidae
Spiders of Africa